The Thick Walled Room (壁あつき部屋 - Romaji - Kabe Atsuki Heya) is a Japanese drama film released in 1956, directed by Masaki Kobayashi. The film was completed in 1953, but released in 1956.

Plot 
The film revolves around the plight of ordinary Japanese WWII soldiers, who are being kept prisoner in Sugamo Prison.

Production 
It was the first major film directed by Masaki Kobayashi. The film release was delayed in Japan, for four years until 1956. This was due to the content, the subject of Japanese soldiers, war crimes and their imprisonment was controversial. The US occupation had ended in 1952, but the Japanese Government was concerned that the film would offend the United States, so a number of changes were asked to be made. Kobayashi refused to do make the changes, choosing to simply not release it. The film was shelved, however, it was finally released unaltered.  The film was written by Kôbô Abe, though the content for the script was adapted from diaries of real jailed Japanese soldiers.

The film was also the acting role for famed actor Tatsuya Nakadai The film is notable as one of the first to deal with the Japanese involvement in the atrocities and war crimes of WWII, and follows Kobaoyashi's interest in war, often a focus of his films

Cast 
 Kô Mishima as Yokota
 Torahiko Hamada as Yamashita
 Keiko Kishi as Yoshiko
 Tatsuya Nakadai (his first role)

References

External links 

1956 films
Films directed by Masaki Kobayashi
Japanese war drama films
1950s war drama films
World War II prisoner of war films
1950s Japanese films
Japanese black-and-white films